Prairie Township is one of twenty-four townships in Hancock County, Illinois, USA.  As of the 2010 census, its population was 380 and it contained 179 housing units.  It was formed from Montebello and Carthage townships on September 12, 1854.

Geography

Cities, towns, villages
 Elvaston (east portion)
 Ferris (south edge)

Unincorporated towns
 McCall at 
(This list is based on USGS data and may include former settlements.)

Cemeteries
The township contains Elvaston Cemetery.

Major highways
  U.S. Route 136

Airports and landing strips
 Hanks Hangar Airport
 Kirchner Airport
 Martins Airport
 Schilson Field

Demographics

School districts
 Hamilton Community Consolidated School District 328

Political districts
 Illinois's 18th congressional district
 State House District 94
 State Senate District 47

References
 United States Census Bureau 2008 TIGER/Line Shapefiles
 
 United States National Atlas

External links
 City-Data.com
 Illinois State Archives
 Township Officials of Illinois

Townships in Hancock County, Illinois
Townships in Illinois

es:Municipio de Prairie (condado de Crawford, Illinois)